William Husband was a Scottish professional association footballer who played as a winger.

References

Footballers from Kilmarnock
Scottish footballers
Association football midfielders
St Mirren F.C. players
Burnley F.C. players
Hamilton Academical F.C. players
English Football League players
Scottish Football League players
Year of birth missing
Year of death missing